Johnson Mbangiwa (born 28 February 1956) is a Botswanan long-distance runner. He competed in the marathon at the 1984 Summer Olympics.

References

External links
 

1956 births
Living people
Athletes (track and field) at the 1984 Summer Olympics
Botswana male long-distance runners
Botswana male marathon runners
Olympic athletes of Botswana
Commonwealth Games competitors for Botswana
Athletes (track and field) at the 1986 Commonwealth Games
Place of birth missing (living people)